The Middle Atlantic League (or Mid-Atlantic League) was a lower-level circuit in American minor league baseball that played during the second quarter of the 20th century.

History
The Middle Atlantic League played from 1925 through 1951, with the exception of three seasons (1943–45) when the loop suspended operations during World War II. The league primarily featured clubs based in the U.S. states of Pennsylvania, Ohio and West Virginia, although it had a team in Maryland and, in its final season, one in New York. Its longest-tenured team, in Johnstown, Pennsylvania - the Johnnies - existed for 19 seasons. Its final champion was the 1951 Niagara Falls Citizens.

Throughout its 24-year history, the Middle Atlantic League was a Class-C level, one rung up from the lowest classification, Class-D.

Elmer M. Daily was president of the league through 23 years of its existence.

List of teams

Akron, OH: Akron Yankees 1935–1941
Altoona, PA: Altoona Engineers 1931
Beaver Falls, PA: Beaver Falls Beavers 1931
Beckley, WV: Beckley Black Knights 1931–1934; Beckley Miners 1935
Butler, PA: Butler Yankees 1946–1947; Butler Tigers 1948–1951
Canton, OH: Canton Terriers 1936–1942
Charleroi, PA: Charleroi Babes 1927–1928; Charleroi Governors 1929–1931
Charleston, WV: Charleston Senators 1931–1942
Clarksburg, WV: Clarksburg Generals 1925–1932 
Cumberland, MD: Cumberland Colts 1925–1932, 1941–1942
Dayton, OH: Dayton Ducks 1933–1938; Dayton Wings 1939–1940
Erie, PA: Erie Sailors 1938–1939, 1941–1942,1946–1951
Fairmont, WV: Fairmont Maroons 1925; Fairmont Black Diamonds 1926–1931
Hagerstown, MD: Hagerstown Hubs 1931
Huntington, WV: Huntington Boosters 1931–1933; Huntington Red Birds 1934–1936
Jeannette, PA: Jeannette Jays 1926–1931
Johnstown, PA: Johnstown Johnnies 1925–1938, 1946–1950
Lockport, NY: Lockport Locks 1951
New Castle, PA: New Castle Chiefs 1948; New Castle Nats 1949–1950; New Castle Indians 1951
Niagara Falls, NY: Niagara Falls Frontiers 1946–1947; Niagara Falls Citizens 1950–1951
Oil City, PA: Oil City Oilers 1946; Oil City Refiners 1947–1950; Oil City A's 1951
Parkersburg, WV: Parkersburg Parkers 1931
Portsmouth, OH: Portsmouth Pirates 1935–1936; Portsmouth Red Birds 1937–1940
Scottdale, PA: Scottdale Scotties 1925–1930; Scottdale Cardinals 1931
Springfield, OH: Springfield Chicks 1933; Springfield Pirates 1934; Springfield Indians 1937–1939; Springfield Cardinals 1941–1942
Uniontown, PA: Uniontown Cokers 1926; Uniontown Coal Barons 1947–1949
Vandergrift, PA: Vandergrift Pioneers 1947–1950
Wheeling, WV: Wheeling Stogies 1925–1931, 1933–1934
Youngstown, OH: Youngstown Tubers 1931; Youngstown Browns 1939–1941; Youngstown Gremlins 1946; Youngstown Colts 1947–1948; Youngstown Athletics 1949–1951
Zanesville, OH: Zanesville Grays 1933–1937; Zanesville Cubs 1941–1942

League champions

1925 - Johnstown Johnnies 
1926 - Johnstown Johnnies -2 
1927 - Cumberland Colts 
1928 - Fairmont Black Diamonds
1929 - Charleroi Governors 
1930 - Johnstown Johnnies -3 
1931 - Cumberland Colts -2 
1932 - Charleston Senators -2 
1933 - Zanesville Grays 
1934 - Zanesville Grays - 2
1935 - Huntington Red Birds
1936 - Zanesville Grays - 3
1937 - Canton Terriers
1938 - Portsmouth Red Birds
1939 - Canton Terriers -2 
1940 - Akron Yankees
1941 - Erie Sailors
1942 - Erie Sailors -2 
1943 - League shutdown due to World War II
1944 - League shutdown due to World War II
1945 - League shutdown due to World War II
1946 - Erie Sailors -3 
1947 - Vandergrift Pioneers
1948 - Erie Sailors -4 
1949 - Erie Sailors -5 
1950 - Butler Tigers
1951 - Niagara Falls Citizens

Baseball Hall of Fame alumni 
Chief Bender, 1927 Johnstown Johnnies 
Joe Cronin, 1925 Johnstown Johnnies 
Whitey Ford, 1947 Butler Yankees 
Bob Lemon, 1938–1939 Springfield Indians 
Joe Medwick, 1930 Scottdale Scotties

References
Johnson, Lloyd and Wolff, Miles, editors: The Encyclopedia of Minor League Baseball. Durham, N.C.: Baseball America, 1997.

External links
Baseball Reference

Middle Atlantic League
Baseball leagues in Ohio
Baseball leagues in Pennsylvania
Baseball leagues in New York (state)
Baseball leagues in West Virginia
Baseball leagues in Maryland
Sports leagues established in 1925
Sports leagues disestablished in 1951